Roberto Alfonso Farrell (6 October 1949 – 30 December 2010) was an Aruban dancer and singer. He was the male member of the 1970s pop and disco group Boney M.

Biography

Birth and early life 
Farrell was born and raised on the island of Aruba in the Dutch colony of Curaçao and Dependencies (later known as the Netherlands Antilles). He left after finishing school at 15 and was a sailor for two years before moving to Norway. He then went to the Netherlands, where he found occasional work as a DJ before finding better opportunities in Germany.

Years with Boney M. 

In Germany, he worked mostly as a DJ until producer Frank Farian spotted him for his new Boney M. group. He became the sole male singer in the group, but Farian later revealed that Bobby made almost no vocal contributions to the group's records, with Farian performing the male parts on the songs in the studio. Liz Mitchell said only she, Marcia Barrett and Farian had sung on the hit recordings. Farrell did, however, perform live in some of the various incarnations of Boney M., including the main 1970s incarnation. Farrell left the group in 1981, after clashes with Farian. He was replaced by Reggie Tsiboe. He re-joined in 1984 and continued as a member until it finally split in 1986. 

Farrell's daughter Zanillya Farrell says Farian deprived Farrell of his rights over Boney M.'s hits, which caused her father to lose all his income after the band split.

When Dad asked Farian for 100,000 marks he was told to sign some papers. He signed away everything – image rights, royalties, the lot. My father lost everything. We had to move in with my grandmother in the Netherlands and live on welfare. After that, Dad started getting angry a lot. But Mum was very smart and realised if you own the name you can use it. Farian had not registered Boney M. all over the world. So that's why Dad could perform in certain countries.

After the band split, he toured with his own group performing the band's hits under the name Bobby Farrell's Boney M. He also appeared as a dancer in late 2005 in the Roger Sanchez videoclip of "Turn on the Music".

Later years and death 
Farrell lived for many years in Amsterdam, in the neighbourhood of Gaasperdam in the borough of Amsterdam-Zuidoost.

In 1981, he married to Macedonian Romani Jasmina Shaban. They had a daughter named Zanillya in 1983, and a son named Zanin. They split in 1995.

He died on the morning of 30 December 2010, in a hotel in St. Petersburg, Russia, of heart failure. His agent, John Seine said Farrell was complaining of breathing problems after performing with his band the evening before. Farrell's body was discovered by hotel staff after he failed to respond to an alarm call. Coincidentally, he died on the same date and in the same city as Grigori Rasputin, the subject of one of his group's most iconic songs, and who he had dressed as in some live performances. He was buried at Zorgvlied cemetery in Amsterdam. 

His daughter, Zanillya Farrell is a rapper. In December 2011, she won the national music prize Grote Prijs van Nederland in the hip-hop category.

Discography 

Singles
 1982: "Polizei" / "A Fool in Love"
 1985: "King of Dancing" / "I See You"
 1987: "Hoppa Hoppa" / "Hoppa Hoppa" (instrumental)
 1991: "Tribute to Josephine Baker"
 2004: "Aruban Style" (Mixes) S-Cream featuring Bobby Farrell
 2006: The Bump EP
 2010: "Bamboo Song" (Roundhouse Records)

Various compilations (as "Bobby Farrell's Boney M." / as "Boney M. featuring Bobby Farrell" / "Bobby Farrell featuring Sandy Chambers")
 2000: The Best of Boney M. (DVMore)
 2001: Boney M. – I Successi (DVMore)
 2001: The Best of Boney M. (II)
 2001: The Best of Boney M. (III)
 2005: Boney M. – Remix 2005 (featuring Sandy Chambers) (Crisler)
 2007: Boney M. – Disco Collection

Note: these releases contain re-recordings of Boney M.'s hits, not the original versions.

References

External links

1949 births
2010 deaths
Boney M. members
Entertainers from Amsterdam
Aruban singers
Dutch people of Aruban descent
Aruban emigrants to Germany
Dutch emigrants to Germany
People from San Nicolaas
Aruban people of African descent